This ship was originally a fishing trawler launched on 24 March 1936.  She was requisitioned by the Royal Navy upon the outbreak of the Second World War in 1939 and designated HMT Lord Middleton with the pennant number (FY219).  

She survived the war and was returned to her owner in July 1945.  She was scrapped in 1964.  Her sister-ship, HMT Lord Austin, was lost on 24 June 1944.

The ship features in a song written by Alan Bell of The Taverners Folk Group: "So spare to her a kindly glance if e'er you're passing by, for over there in the old scrapyard the Lord Middleton must die".

Service in the Second World War
In April 1942, Lord Middelton rescued crew from the torpedoed merchantman Empire Howard.  In May of the same year, she also rescued some of the crew of the Soviet ship Tsiolkovskij after that vessel was eventually sunk by attacks from a German U-boat and two destroyers.  

During the battle,  was hit and sustained major damage. Lord Middleton evacuated 80 of her 190-strong crew, leaving some of them to try to save the ship. When the ship eventually broke in two and sank five days later, Lord Middleton and  pulled 35 more of her crew from the sea.  

On 17 February 1943, as part of the Arctic convoy JW 53 to the Soviet port of Murmansk, HMT Lord Middleton suffered flooding in her forward storeroom in the bad weather and was lagging behind the convoy.  She was forced to retreat to Scapa Flow escorted by the corvette HMS Dianella.

References
Naval-History.net
Uboat.net ASW Trawler HMS Lord Middleton

Anti-submarine trawlers of the Royal Navy
1936 ships
Ships built in Selby